The Rolling Stones' 1965 2nd British Tour was a concert tour by the band. The tour commenced on September 24 and concluded on October 17, 1965.

The Rolling Stones
Mick Jagger – lead vocals, harmonica, percussion
Keith Richards – guitar, backing vocals
Brian Jones – guitar, harmonica, backing vocals
Bill Wyman – bass guitar, backing vocals
Charlie Watts – drums

Tour set list
Songs performed include:
She Said Yeah
Mercy, Mercy
Hitch Hike
Cry To Me
The Last Time
That's How Strong My Love Is
I'm Moving On
Talkin' 'Bout You
Oh Baby
(I Can't Get No) Satisfaction

Tour dates

References
 Carr, Roy.  The Rolling Stones: An Illustrated Record.  Harmony Books, 1976.  

The Rolling Stones concert tours
1965 concert tours
1965 in the United Kingdom
September 1965 events in the United Kingdom
October 1965 events in the United Kingdom
Concert tours of the United Kingdom